Landlocked is a country that does not have territory connected to an ocean.

Landlocked may also refer to:

Landlocked (novel), a 1965 novel by Doris Lessing, fourth in the series Children of Violence
Landlocked, working title for the 1971 Beach Boys album Surf's Up
Landlocked, working title for the 1972 Beach Boys album Carl and the Passions – "So Tough"
Landlocked, 1992 album by Australian musician Chris Wilson
Landlocked Film Festival, an annual film festival hosted in Iowa City, Iowa, U.S.

See also
Landlocked parcel, a real estate plot that has no legal access to a public right of way